Piterimka is a rural locality (a village) in Yurovskoye Rural Settlement, Gryazovetsky District, Vologda Oblast, Russia. The population was 23 as of 2002.

Geography 
Piterimka is located 33 km northwest of Gryazovets (the district's administrative centre) by road. Balagurovo is the nearest rural locality.

References 

Rural localities in Gryazovetsky District